To the Yet Unknowing World is a limited-edition EP album by American singer-songwriter Josh Ritter. It was released on February 8, 2011.

Background
The EP features b-sides, demos, and remixes from the So Runs the World Away recording sessions.  To the Yet Unknowing World was first made available on Ritter's official website and at his 2011 tour performances. The EP later went on sale in record stores and iTunes, February 15, 2011. The title is from a line in the fifth act of Shakespeare's Hamlet (the title of So Runs the World Away was also from a line of Hamlet, however, from the third act).

In addition to the six songs on the EP, music videos for "The Curse" and "Rattling Locks" were released as well.  They were directed by Liam Hurley and Sam Kassirer respectively.

Track listing
All songs written by Josh Ritter.

 "Galahad" (studio b-side) – 4:17
 "Tokyo!" (studio b-side) – 3:19
 "Wild Goose" (for Rainn Wilson's book SoulPancake) – 2:29
 "Lantern" (acoustic Josh Ritter and Sam Kassirer demo) – 4:47
 "The Remnant" (Wallpaper remix) – 4:11
 "Rattling Locks" (Hesta Prynn remix) – 4:58

Personnel

Musicians
 Josh Ritter — vocals and guitar
 Zack Hickman – bass
 Austin Nevins – guitar
 Liam Hurley – drums and percussion
 Sam Kassirer – piano and keyboard

Production
Produced by Sam Kassirer
Recorded at the Great North Sound Society in Parsonsfield, Maine
Mastered by Jeff Lipton, Ian Kennedy, and Marla Rice at Peerless Mastering
Artwork by Matthew Fleming

References

External links
Josh Ritter official website

2011 EPs
Josh Ritter albums